Demon Crossing is an album released by Yellow #5 in 2004.

Track listing
All tracks by Molly McGuire except where noted

 "Demon Crossing" – 2:13
 "Auto Pilot" – 6:25
 "No Loitering" – 3:36
 "Screaming Mimi" – 4:14
 "Moon Man" – 5:22
 "Bad Girl" (Dave Catching) – 0:32
 "Jackie" – 5:34
 "Lust" – 3:12
 "ICFCFBM" – 4:30
 "Seven Addictions" – 3:04
 "Hair of the Dog" – 3:37
 "Herman R. Miller, Esq. III" – 0:19
 "Wine-Spo-Dee-O-Dee" (Stick McGhee cover) – 2:44
 "Deviant Angel" – 4:35
 "Cut Off, LA" (Catching) –

Band members
 Molly McGuire - bass, vocals, accordion, piano, percussion
 Dave Catching - guitar, lapsteel
 Brant Bjork - drums
 Jose Medeles - drums (2, 14)
 Chris Goss - background vocals (5)
 Brenndan McGuire - Pro One, acoustic guitar, percussion

References

External links

2004 albums